Pavel Stanislavovich Galkin (born 9 October 1968) is a retired Russian athlete who specialised in the sprinting events. He competed for the Unified Team at the 1992 Summer Olympics.

His personal best in the 100 metres is 10.20 set in 1994.

Competition record

References

1968 births
Living people
Russian male sprinters
Soviet male sprinters
Olympic athletes of the Unified Team
Athletes (track and field) at the 1992 Summer Olympics
World Athletics Championships athletes for Russia
Goodwill Games medalists in athletics
Competitors at the 1990 Goodwill Games